Muderic or Munderichus was a Thervingian Gothic warrior and Roman general. He was a member of the nobility of the Thervingi. In the late 370s, along with Lagarimanus, Muderic fought as a general under Athanaric against the invading Huns. Muderic later joined the Roman army, rising to the rank of Dux of Arabia.

See also
 Vadomarius

References

Sources
 Ammianus Marcellinus. Roman History.584.5

4th-century Gothic people
Ancient Roman generals
Gothic warriors